The Alliance of National Forces (ANS) is a Czech political party. It was established in 2011 under the name Citizens 2011 and its first chair was Ludvík Adámek. The party ran in the 2013 legislative election only in Prague. On June 2, 2018, Vladimíra Vítová was registered as chair, and on July 2, 2018, the party was renamed the Alliance of National Forces.

Position
According to its website, the Alliance of National Forces supports the Czech Republic's withdrawal from NATO and the European Union, supports the "traditional family", supports the nationalization of strategic sectors of the national economy and natural resources (water and minerals) and the abolition of church restitutions. The party opposes "migration planned by the European Union", "modern slavery of multinational companies and debt collections", the repeal of the Beneš decrees, and "efforts to liquidate the Czech state".

The first website of the Alliance of National Forces featured Karel Janko, Chairman of the Czech National Socialist Party, Zbyněk Štěpán, Chairman of National Prosperity, and Vladimíra Vítová, Chairwoman of the Czech Peace Forum. The website also listed 13 advisers and consultants, including 3 former Czech Social Democratic Party (ČSSD) ministers (Jaroslav Bašta, Ivan David and Eduard Zeman).

Electoral history

2019 European Parliament election 
The party participated in the 2019 European Parliament election, with Jiří Černohorský as the lead candidate. The party received 1,971 votes (0.08%) and did not win any seats.

2020 Czech Senate election 
The party participated in the 2020 Senate election, but did not have any senators elected. After the election, the party lodged a complaint with the Supreme Administrative Court to invalidate the election due to unequal access to the media. The Supreme State Court rejected the complaint, stating that "balance and equal treatment in these contexts cannot be understood mechanically as absolute equality of candidates, but from the point of view of so-called graduated equality".

Election results

Chamber of Deputies

European Parliament

References

External links 
 Aliance národních sil

Political parties established in 2011
Political parties in the Czech Republic
Nationalist parties in the Czech Republic
Eurosceptic parties in the Czech Republic
2011 establishments in the Czech Republic